The United States territory of Guam is divided into nineteen municipalities, called villages. Each village is governed by an elected mayor. Village populations range in size from under 1,000 to over 40,000. In the 2020 census, the total population of Guam was 153,836. Each village is counted as a county equivalent by the United States Census Bureau for statistical purposes.

History 

Many villages have rich histories reaching back thousands of years. Artifacts from ancient Chamorro settlements can be found in every village of Guam. When the Spanish Empire colonized the Marianas Islands as part of its Pacific possessions in the 16th and 17th centuries, the island was divided into separate districts with each district consisting of a parish with a village center governed by an alcalde, appointed by the island's governor.

In the 18th century, there were six parishes on Guam: Hagåtña, Hagat, Humåtak, Malesso', Inalåjan, and Pago.

Prior to Spanish colonization, Chamorro people regularly held village celebrations.  After adopting Christianity, these celebrations became fiestas in honor of the patron saint of each village.  Annual village fiestas are still held throughout the island every year.

The current division of Guam into municipalities took place in the 1920s under United States Navy Administration. Santa Rita was formerly Sumay, before the U.S. taking of that village after World War II.

List of villages

See also 
 List of census-designated places in Guam
 List of villages in the Northern Mariana Islands
 Geography of Guam
 Village (United States)

References 

 Rogers, Robert F (1995). Destiny's Landfall: A History of Guam: University of Hawai'i Press. 
 Carter, Lee D; Carter, Rosa Roberto; Wuerch, William L (1997). Guam History: Perspectives Volume One: MARC. 
 Sanchez, Pedro C. Guahan, Guam: The History of our Island: Sanchez Publishing House.

External links 

 
 

 
Populated
Guam 1
Guam
Guam